Thomas Robert Vaughn (February 28, 1943 – July 5, 2020) was an American football player and coach. He played college football at Iowa State and as a safety in the National Football League (NFL) for the Detroit Lions from 1965 to 1971. 

Vaughn was born in 1943 at Troy, Ohio. He attended  Troy High School where he was a high school All-American.

At Iowa State, he played as a fullback on offense and as a safety on defense.  He tallied 1,889 rushing yards for Iowa State between 1962 and 1964. He also led the Big Eight Conference in punt returns in 1963 and 1964. As a senior, he was selected by both the Associated Press and UPI as a first-team defensive back on the 1964 All-Big Eight Conference football team.

He was drafted by the Detroit Lions in the fifth round of the 1965 NFL Draft. Between 1965 and 1971, he appeared in 88 games with the Lions, 61 as a starter, tallying nine interceptions and nine fumble recoveries.  He also returned 62 kickoffs for 1,595 yards (25.7-yard average) and 33 punts for 298 yards (9.0-yard average). 

After missing much of the 1971 season due to a head injury, Vaughn announced his retirement in June 1972. He said at the time that he had been knocked out 20 times and was tired of it.

After retiring as a player, he held assistant coaching positions with the Detroit Wheels (1974), Iowa State (1975), Missouri,  Wyoming, and Arizona State.

Vaughn died in 2020, at age 77.

References

1943 births
2020 deaths
People from Troy, Ohio
Coaches of American football from Ohio
Players of American football from Ohio
American football safeties
Iowa State Cyclones football players
Detroit Lions players